Tomasz Kuklicz (born 11 October 1975), known professionally as DJ Tomekk, is a Polish-born German-based hip hop DJ and record producer. Rappers who have featured in his songs include Ice-T, Fatman Scoop, Khia, Xzibit, Fler, Sido, Kurupt, Lil' Kim, KRS-One, Torch, Afrob, Flavor Flav, and GZA.

DJ Tomekk's debut album, Return of Hip Hop, was released in 2001, and was followed by Beat of Life Vol. 1 in 2003 and Numma Eyns ("Number One") in 2005.

Early life 
Tomekk was born in Kraków, Poland. His father was a Moroccan pianist and his mother a visual artist. At the age of 10, Tomekk met a DJ for the first time and was inspired by his work. That same year, his father emigrated to Germany and Tomekk followed him to West Berlin, where he lived in Berlin's Wedding district and attended the Diesterweg High School. His father died five years later. Tomekk lived in the children's home "Frohsinn" in Wedding from the age of 15 to 18. During this time he met the rapper Sido, five years his junior. Sido would later dedicate one of his songs to Tomekk. As a teenager, Tomekk got his own radio show on 98.8 KISS FM Berlin called "Boogie Down Berlin". At 17, he made his first recording contract with Stuff Records, and in 1991 released the single "OC featuring MC Mis One".

Career

1992–2002 
In 1993, DJ Tomekk invited Kurtis Blow to Kiss FM Berlin. Coincidentally, Kurtis Blow needed a short-term replacement DJ and offered the position to Tomekk. After that, Tomekk toured with him for a year through the east and west coast of the US, the east coast and west coast. While he was barely known in Germany, he already appeared in the US together with Run-DMC, Public Enemy, Ice-T, the Wu-Tang Clan, LL Cool J and KRS-One. After their US tour, Tomekk returned to Europe where he continued to tour with Blow.

In November 1993, Tomekk was honored for his work by the City of Los Angeles for Peace and International Understanding. In 1994, DJ Tomekk became the first non-US American to be nominated for the 1st Annual Rap Music Award. 5. Juli 1996 that year he toured with the band Reality Brothers and acts as opening act at Reggea Summer Jam by Ziggy Marley.

From the mid-nineties DJ Tomekk produced his first compilations and mixtapes, where he frequently integrated American and German artists together in his songs. In 1998, he founded one of the first hip hop labels "Hip Hop Büro Berlin" with Ronny Boldt, a roommate of his flat-sharing community in Berlin Mitte. Here, first mixtapes were produced on a cassette copying machine.

In 1999, Tomekk produced the single "1, 2, 3, ... Rhymes Galore", which featured Grandmaster Flash, Flavor Flav, Afrob, Jazzy Jeff, and MC Rene. The song stayed in the German Top 10 charts for several weeks, peaking at number 6 in the German charts. 1999 he produced a remix for Jay Z's "Anything", which rose to number 9 in the US charts on the 12" vinyl "Anything (The Berlin Remixes)". His second single, "Ich lebe für Hip Hop", featured GZA, Prodigal Sunn, Curse and the Stieber Twins, and reached number 11 in Germany. In 2001, he released the single "Return of Hip Hop (Ooh, Ooh)", featuring KRS-One, Torch and MC Rene, and later that year released his first album, also entitled Return of Hip Hop.

In 2001 he went to the studio with Shaquille O'Neal. Their music was used for the America-wide advertising campaign against drunk driving. That same year, he produced the single "Beat of Life" with Ice-T, which stayed in the German charts for 9 weeks, peaking at number 12.

From July 2001 Tomekk ran a biofarm near Berlin with guest apartments and studios. Here artists from all over the world produce and young musicians are supported. Under his label Boogie Down Berlin he was booked by many American hip hop and RNB artists as a producer. In 2002, his song "Kimnotyze" with Lil' Kim reached number 6 in Germany.

2003–2013 

In 2003, DJ Tomekk released with American rapper Kurupt the single "Ganxtaville Pt. III", which placed fifth on the German charts, as well as in the charts of Austria and Switzerland. He toured with his Boogie Down Berlin crew (DJ Noppe, Saeed, Trooper Da Don), where he completed about 150 appearances.

In 2008, Tomekk featured in the third series of German reality show Ich bin ein Star – Holt mich hier raus! but was evicted by RTL Television for making a Nazi salute and singing "Deutschland über Alles". In response, Tomekk stated his actions were clearly a joke that was not intended to incite racism, noting among other things that his wife is African.

On the occasion of their 20th stage anniversary, DJ Tomekk and Kurtis Blow jointly released the single "The Legendary Hip Hop Sway" about 20 years DJ Tomekk and MC Kurtis under the label "Boogie Down Berlin" with a video and won the Music recording certification in gold.

2013–present 

DJ Tomekk renounced all drugs and began campaigning against drug use as a speaker, author and sponsor.

In 2016, he released the single "Lonely" with Dante Thomas. and in 2019 the single "Never Give Up" with M.O.P.

Discography

Albums

Singles

Remixes

Awards 
Juice Awards
1999: Category Best Producer

1 Live Krone
 2000: in Category Best Producer

Bravo Otto
 2000: Gold in Category HipHop National
 2002: Silber in Category HipHop National
 2003: Silber in Category HipHop National

Comet Award
 2000: Category "Best Newcomer"

Other awards
 2003: Rap Music Award
 MC Mega Music Award

References

External links
Official site (in German)

1975 births
Living people
Musicians from Kraków
Polish musicians
Polish hip hop DJs
Polish people of Moroccan descent
Musicians from Berlin
People from Mitte
German hip hop DJs
Polish emigrants to Germany